Mere Contemplations is the third album by extreme metal band Enslavement of Beauty from Norway. The album was released in 2007 by INRI Unlimited. All music composed by Tony Eugene Tunheim, all lyrics written by Ole Alexander Myrholt except for parts of "X and Moments", from the poem "X. In a Library" by Emily Dickinson.

Track listing

"A Study of Love and Metaphors" - 03:21
"X and Moments" - 04:07
"The Perilous Pursuit of Volition" - 03:31
"Exit There; and Disappear" - 05:07
"An Affinity for Exuberance" - 03:58
"Abundance Extends to Lush" - 03:44
"I Raise My craving Hands" - 03:27
"Nostalgia Grows" - 03:10
"Impressions" - 04:07
"11:23 pm" - 05:12

Musicians
 Ole Alexander Myrholt - Vocals
 Tony Eugene Tunheim - Guitar, Keyboard
 Lisa T. Johnsen - Vocals

Other personnel
 Sten Brian Tunheim - Cover Art
 Henrik Ryösä - Mastering

External links
 MySpace
 Encyclopaedia Metallum
 INRI Unlimited

2001 albums
Enslavement of Beauty albums